In the sport of baseball, a loss is a statistic credited to the pitcher of the losing team who allows the run that gives the opposing team the lead with which the game is won (the go-ahead run). The losing pitcher is the pitcher who allows the go-ahead run to reach base for a lead that the winning team never relinquishes. If a pitcher allows a run which gives the opposing team the lead, his team comes back to lead or tie the game, and then the opposing team regains the lead against a subsequent pitcher, the earlier pitcher does not get the loss.

John Coleman holds the record for most losses in a single season, losing 48 games in 1883. Will White (42 in 1880), Larry McKeon (41 in 1884), George Bradley (40 in 1879), and Jim McCormick (40 in 1879) are the only other pitchers to lose more than 40 games in a single season. There has been 50 instances of a pitcher losing more than 30 games in a season, all taking place during the 19th century.

Key

List

See also

Baseball statistics
List of Major League Baseball career losses leaders

References

External links
Baseball-Reference

Major League Baseball records
Major League Baseball lists